Jorge Alexis Henríquez Neira (born 17 June 1994) is a Chilean footballer who plays for Ñublense.

References

1994 births
Living people
Footballers from Santiago
Chilean footballers
Audax Italiano footballers
San Marcos de Arica footballers
A.C. Barnechea footballers
Segunda División Profesional de Chile players
Chilean Primera División players
Primera B de Chile players
Association football midfielders